Naomh Eoin is a Gaelic Athletic Association club based in Myshall, County Carlow. Named in honour of Pope John XXIII, the club was founded in 1968 and fields teams in both hurling and Gaelic football.

History
In 1986 Namoh Eoin became the only club in Carlow to win the Senior Football and Senior Hurling Championship double.

Honours

 Carlow Senior Hurling Championship (18): 1974, 1975, 1976, 1978, 1981, 1982, 1985, 1986, 1987, 1990, 1991, 1992, 1993, 1994, 1995, 1998, 2003, 2005
 Carlow Senior Football Championship (1): 1986

References

Gaelic games clubs in County Carlow
Hurling clubs in County Carlow
Gaelic football clubs in County Carlow